Defending champion Steffi Graf defeated Helena Suková in the final, 6–4, 6–4 to win the women's singles tennis title at the 1989 Australian Open.

Seeds
The seeded players are listed below. Steffi Graf is the champion; others show the round in which they were eliminated.

  Steffi Graf (champion)
  Martina Navratilova (quarterfinals)
  Gabriela Sabatini (semifinals)
  Pam Shriver (third round)
  Helena Suková (finalist)
  Zina Garrison (quarterfinals)
  Barbara Potter (first round)
  Claudia Kohde-Kilsch (quarterfinals)
  Lori McNeil (first round)
  Mary Joe Fernández (third round)
  Sylvia Hanika (first round)
  Patty Fendick (second round)
  Raffaella Reggi (fourth round)
  Anne Minter (second round)
  Hana Mandlíková (fourth round)
  Nicole Provis (fourth round)

Qualifying

Draw

Key
 Q = Qualifier
 WC = Wild card
 LL = Lucky loser
 r = Retired

Finals

Earlier rounds

Section 1

Section 2

Section 3

Section 4

Section 5

Section 6

Section 7

Section 8

External links
 1989 Australian Open – Women's draws and results at the International Tennis Federation

Women's singles
Australian Open (tennis) by year – Women's singles